The 1987 Ipswich Borough Council election was an election to the Ipswich Borough Council under the arrangement, whereby a third of the councillors were to stand for election, each time.

It took place as part of the 1987 United Kingdom local elections.  

There were 16 wards each returning one councillor plus one bye-elections for St Margaret's Ward. The Labour Party retained control of the Council.

References

Ipswich Borough Council elections
Ipswich